Timuquana Country Club is a private golf and country club in Jacksonville, Florida. Located in Jacksonville's Ortega neighborhood, it was founded in 1923. Its golf course was originally designed by legend Donald Ross, and members have included PGA Tour professionals Steve Melnyk, David Duval and current member Jim Furyk. It has hosted various golf tournaments since its opening, including the 2002 United States Senior Men's Amateur Golf Championship, the United States Golf Association (USGA) U.S. Women's Amateur Four-Ball Championship in 2019, and is the host site for the PGA TOUR Champions Constellation Furyk & Friends starting in 2021.

History

Beginnings
On May 25, 1921, a group of 50 prominent gentlemen met at the Seminole Social Club in downtown Jacksonville to consider the organization of a new club to provide a superior golf facility. They adopted the name "Timuquana," a variation of the name of the Timucua, a Native American people who once lived along the St. Johns River. Their charter was approved on February 12, 1923, and within three months, membership had grown to 185. Timuquana Country Club's first president was John L. Roe. Donald Ross, the most noted golf course architect in the United States, was engaged to design and build the course in 1923. After playing the new course, two club members suggested that additional sand traps on the fairways would enliven play, and donated them. Vic Foreman was the club's golf pro for 43 years, from 1925 to 1968.

Several professional tournaments were played at Timuquana soon after the course was built, attracting the best golfers of the era, and exhibition matches featured Johnny Farrell, Walter Hagen, Gene Sarazen and Horton Smith. The course hosted the Southern Amateur championship several times, and the 1928 Florida State Amateur Tournament was won by club president Al Ulmer at Timuquana.

The years during the Great Depression in the United States were difficult for the club. Membership fell to 51, and the club could not afford a manager. The club reorganized their financial affairs in 1936, cutting costs to a bare minimum, and survived. Bobby Jones was stationed at Naval Air Station Jacksonville during World War II and often played golf at neighboring Timuquana. Robert Trent Jones, another well-known golf course designer, worked with club members in 1948 to develop a ten-year blueprint for improving the course. Many of the suggestions were implemented during the 1950s, including adding a lake on the 5th, which the tee shot must traverse. This became the course's signature hole.

Sectional qualifying rounds were held at Timuquana for several USGA Senior Amateur Championships, and the US Amateur Championships in 1955, 1966, 1970, 1973 and 1976. George Cobb tweaked the course design in 1957 and 1963, as did David W. Gordon in 1968, who added a lake to the 6th hole. In the seventy years since Donald Ross built the course, the changes introduced by other architects to "freshen" the course had erased the characteristics that made the original design playable and enjoyable. Bobby Weed was tasked in 1995 with restoring the Ross design, but there were no blueprints or design notes. His only reference was a 1943 aerial photograph from the nearby Navy base. On three holes, Workers found groups of bushes planted as 150-yard markers in 1923 that were now 20 yards in the rough. Between April and October 1996, Weed cleared brush and cut down 800 trees that had encroached on the fairways, restoring the angles that Ross intended.

At the end of the 1990s, new federal rules required more efficient use of water for irrigating non-agricultural land. The southern property line of Timuquana Country Club abuts the Naval Air Station Jacksonville, and they partnered with the Navy to use the base's treated wastewater effluent for golf course irrigation, which began in the fall of 1997.

1952 aircraft accident

At approximately 10.00 am on the 19th of March, a pilot on a routine training flight from the adjacent US Navy base had engine trouble due to low oil pressure. He attempted to land back at the base, but instead tried to make an emergency landing on the 7th hole. The plane landed on the fairway, instantly killing Bertha Johnson and Mary Dempsey, who had just played their tee shots and were walking to their balls. The plane continued down the fairway, crashing into a clump of trees before exploding into flames. The pilot scrambled out of the wreckage, before being informed of the tragedy that had occurred.

Other amenities

Golf Course & Practice Areas
The centerpiece of the club is its 18-hole Championship golf course, designed by Donald Ross. Beginning in January 2022, the golf course will undergo a full renovation - the first full renovation of this scale for the course in 25 years. The project will include replacement of the irrigation systems, re-grassing of the fairways, the addition of new cart paths, and additional work. In the summer of 2021, the club began work on a full renovation of its Driving Range and practice areas as well, helping to continue the club's legacy of having one of the finest courses and golf facilities in the country.

Tennis
Two clay tennis courts were created in 1933 but were little used and eventually removed. In 1963, the Club built four tennis courts and later added four clay courts. A large number of members participate in the club's tennis league, which is active year-round. In 2020, the Club replaced all of the tennis lighting with all-new LED lighting, offering a better evening tennis experience. The eight Har-Tru clay courts also received all new clay and laser leveling at that time. The TCC Tennis program offers something for everyone, with lessons and instruction for all ages, 4 and up, men's and ladies' groups for all levels, pickleball, and special events including round robins, Pro-Am events, themed play like Reggae and All Out 80s, couples games, and special offering like glow tennis with XGlosive.

Swimming pool
Although a swimming pool had been proposed from the earliest days of the club, it was not until after World War II that one was built for and enjoyment of the members and their families. In 1963, the Club added a new swimming pool with family and lap areas. In 2000, the  poolside grille was given a facelift and new restroom facilities were added. In 2019, the Club underwent a full reconstruction of its pool and poolside grill. An all new, beach entry pool overlooking the St. Johns River was constructed, along with a beautiful new riverfront dining facility, The Grove. The Grove includes a walk-up bar, full menu, firepit, and outdoor seating with sweeping views of the River and the Downtown Jacksonville skyline. The pool, which is heated year-round, offers members swimming, lap lanes, water aerobics classes, River Rats swim teams, War Eagles Water Polo, and events including "dive-in" movies and an inflatable obstacle course.

Boating & Dock Facilities
Many members enjoy boating on the St. Johns River, or visiting the club by boat. Alfred I. duPont provided the club's first dock as a gift in 1929. That structure was replaced in 1949, and in early 2002, a new floating dock system was installed for transient docking. Although the Club does not provide marina services, members can utilize the dock facilities to visit for the day. Members may also fish from the dock or participate in one of the club's exciting Fishing Derby tournaments. The club also offers offsite watersports excursions, including kayaking and stand up paddle boarding near Amelia Island or along Jacksonville's intracoastal waterways, tubing in the Florida springs, shark tooth expeditions in and around Brunswick, Georgia, and trips to water and amusement parks around Jacksonville, St. Augustine, Orlando and South Georgia.

Fitness Center
Plans for a  Fitness Center were approved in March 2000, with construction beginning during the summer of 2000 and a grand opening was held July 7, 2001. In 2018, following flood damages from a hurricane, the Fitness Center was completely renovated from floor to ceiling. The Center features Life Fitness equipment, Peloton bikes, TRX equipment, free weights, rowing machines, rack system, springboard Pilates towers and more. The Fitness Center also features a full Spa offering a robust menu of spa services including massage, skin therapies, and more. The Fitness Center offers a weekly schedule of classes, from boot camps and HIIT workouts, to spin, yoga, Pilates, stretch, and more. Members also have access to a staff of personal trainers and an onsite Physical Therapist.

Clubhouse
A clubhouse was built in 1923, but by the 1950s, it became apparent that the club had outgrown the structure. The issue was studied by nearly every club board and committee, and the Permanent Improvement Committee created a plan that involved rebuilding some sections, remodeling others and constructing new additions. It was approved by the membership and construction began in June 1958. The resulting Southern-style clubhouse, which opened December 16, 1958, was designed to resemble Tara from the movie Gone with the Wind. The clubhouse includes a fine dining facility (the Skyline Room), meeting and banquet rooms and casual eating options. Social events, traditions and activities are scheduled year-round. A new men's lounge, known as the "19th Hole" and maintenance/storage buildings were constructed in 1963. The club's 75th anniversary was observed in 1998.

In March 2000 members approved an  expansion to the clubhouse, costing $2.4 million. KBJ Architects designed and managed the projects, which included:
 the men's grille and cocktail lounge was renovated
 expanded "Pow Wow Room" for casual dining 
 a new elevator and handicapped accessible toilet facilities were added to improve facilities for the disabled
 a Heritage Gallery was created to showcase trophies and the club's history 
Construction began during the summer of 2000, and a grand opening was held July 7, 2001.

In 2020, the Club underwent a full renovation to its casual dining room - the Pow Wow Room - and its main kitchen. The project was designed and managed by The ELM Architecture of Jacksonville, with interior design by Hint Harris of Atlanta. The project included a fully redesigned casual dining room and expansive lounge, a see-through wine and whiskey room housing one of the largest wine and whiskey collections in the area, and features all new menus and offerings. The main kitchen was completely renovated as well, including all new layout and equipment, and the addition of a pizza oven, dedicated gluten-free prep and cooking areas, and allowed for a broader array of menu offerings, including vegetarian and plant-based options.

In September 2002, Timuquana hosted the United States Senior Men's Amateur Golf Championship.

In April 2019, Timuquana hosted the United States Golf Association (USGA) U.S. Women's Amateur Four-Ball Championship.

In October 2021, and continuing annually for five years, Timuquana will host the PGA TOUR Champions Constellation Furyk & Friends tournament, hosted by Jim Furyk.

References

External links

Golf clubs and courses in Florida
History of Jacksonville, Florida
Sports venues in Jacksonville, Florida
1923 establishments in Florida